The Azerbaijani passport is issued by the Ministry of Internal Affairs of Azerbaijan to the citizens of Azerbaijan for international travel. Ordinary passports are valid for 10 years (since 2007) from the date of issue and contain 34 visa pages. Passport content is printed both in Azerbaijani and in English.

As of 1 January 2018, Azerbaijani citizens had visa-free or visa on arrival access to 63 countries and territories, ranking the Azerbaijani passport 72nd in terms of travel freedom according to the Henley visa restrictions index.

Types of passports 
 Ordinary passport: Issued to normal citizens.
 Ordinary passports are issued in two different lengths of validity: five and ten years. Azerbaijani citizens up to 18 years of age can only be issued a five-year passport, while those who are 18 years of age or older ten-year (Green) passport.
 Official passport: Issued to public servants.
 Diplomatic passport: Issued to diplomats and their family members and government high-level officials.

Physical appearance
Coat of arms of Azerbaijan is printed in relief in the center of the front cover with "Azərbaycan Respublikası" in Azerbaijani and  "The Republic of Azerbaijan" in English above the coat of arms, as well as, "PASPORT" and "PASSPORT" printed below.

The passport is 88 x 125 mm in size, with 54 pages.

In line with the passport type, Azerbaijani passports can be of the following colors:

 Civil passport-dark green
 Official passport-dark blue
 Diplomatic passport-dark red

Information page
Azerbaijani passports include the following data on the information page:

 Photograph of the holder (digital image printed on page)
 Type (P)
 Passport number
 Surname
 Given names
 Date of birth
 Sex
 Place of birth (only the city or town is listed, even if born outside of Republic of Azerbaijan.)
 Date of issue
 Date of expiry
 Holder's signature (digital image printed on page)
 Machine Readable Zone starting with P<AZE

Biometric passport
New biometric Azerbaijani passports were announced on 17 July 2012.

New passport booklet design is in compliance with ICAO regulation document 9303. The e-passport sign , indicating the presence of a RFID chip, is placed on the cover of the passport, as well as above the photo of the holder on the main rigid information page which contains the RFID chip. It also contains a machine readable zone at the bottom of the page. The overall design of the new booklet, apart from the above-mentioned, does not differ from the previous non-biometric booklet design.

Visa requirements

As of October 2018, Azerbaijani citizens had visa-free or visa on arrival access to 66 countries and territories, ranking the Azerbaijani passport 75th in terms of travel freedom according to the Henley visa restrictions index.

See also
 Visa requirements for Azerbaijani citizens
 Visa policy of Azerbaijan
 Azerbaijan identity card
 Azerbaijani nationality law
 Passports in Europe

External links

 Republic of Azerbaijan Ministry of Foreign Affairs

References

Azerbaij
Government of Azerbaijan